Jean-Baptiste Debret (18 April 1768 – 28 June 1848) was a French painter, who produced many valuable lithographs depicting the people of Brazil. Debret won the second prize at the 1798 Salon des Beaux Arts.

Biography

Debret studied at the French Academy of Fine Arts, a pupil of the great Jacques-Louis David (1748–1825) to whom he was related. He accompanied David to Rome in the 1780s. His debut was at the Salon des Beaux Arts of 1798, where he got the second prize.

He travelled to Brazil in March 1816 as a member of the so-called French Artistic Mission, a group of bonapartist French artists and artisans bound to creating an arts and crafts lyceum in Rio de Janeiro (Escola Real de Artes e Ofícios) under the auspices of King D. João VI and the Count of Barca. The lyceum later became the Academia Imperial de Belas Artes (Imperial Academy of Fine Arts) under Emperor Dom Pedro I.

As a painter favored first by the Portuguese court in exile and later by the imperial court in Rio, Debret was often commissioned to paint portraits of many of its members, such as Portuguese king Dom João VI and the Archduchess Maria Leopoldina of Austria, the first empress of Brazil, who married D. Pedro I (Debret was commissioned to produce a painting of her arrival for the marriage at the Rio port, as well as the public acclaiming of the new Emperor). He established his atelier at the Imperial Academy in December 1822 and became a valued teacher in 1826. In 1829 Debret organized the first arts exhibition ever to take place in Brazil, in which he presented many of his works as well as of his disciples. Emulating David's role during the French Empire, Debret was also involved in the drawing ornaments for many of public ceremonies and official festivities of the court and even some of the courtier's uniforms are credited to him.

He corresponded frequently with his brother in Paris. After noticing his brother's interest  in his depiction of everyday life in Brazil, he started to sketch street scenes, local costumes and relations of the Brazilians in the period between 1816 and 1831. He took a particular interest in slavery of blacks and in the indigenous peoples in Brazil. Together with the German painter Johann Moritz Rugendas (1802–1858), his work is one of the most important graphic documentation of life in Brazil during the early decades of the 19th century.

Debret returned to France in 1831 and became a member of the Academie des Beaux Arts. From 1834 to 1839 he published his monumental series of three volumes of engravings, titled Voyage Pittoresque et Historique au Brésil, ou Séjour d'un Artiste Français au Brésil ("A Picturesque and Historic Voyage to Brazil, or the Sojourn of a French Artist in Brazil").
Unfortunately the work was not a commercial success. In order to survive, he made lithographs depicting paintings by his distant cousin David, but the editions were very limited and money was short. Debret died poor in Paris in 1848.

Gallery

References

External links 

 Facsimile of the 3 books(color, black& white) and scans of 250 lithographs
 DezenoveVinte - Arte Brasileira do século XIX e início do XX 

Artists from Paris
1768 births
1848 deaths
Burials at Montmartre Cemetery
18th-century French painters
French male painters
19th-century French painters
Painters at the Portuguese royal court
Brazilian art
Pupils of Jacques-Louis David
18th-century French male artists